Group B of the 2006 Fed Cup Europe/Africa Zone Group II was one of four pools in the Europe/Africa Zone Group II of the 2006 Fed Cup. Three teams competed in a round robin competition, with the top team and the bottom two teams proceeding to their respective sections of the play-offs: the top teams played for advancement to Group I, while the bottom team faced potential relegation to Group III.

Latvia vs. Greece

Portugal vs. Poland

Latvia vs. Portugal

Poland vs. Greece

Latvia vs. Poland

Portugal vs. Greece

See also
Fed Cup structure

References

External links
 Fed Cup website

2006 Fed Cup Europe/Africa Zone